A total solar eclipse occurred on November 30, 1853. A solar eclipse occurs when the Moon passes between Earth and the Sun, thereby totally or partly obscuring the image of the Sun for a viewer on Earth. A total solar eclipse occurs when the Moon's apparent diameter is larger than the Sun's, blocking all direct sunlight, turning day into darkness. Totality occurs in a narrow path across Earth's surface, with the partial solar eclipse visible over a surrounding region thousands of kilometres wide.

Observations

Related eclipses

Solar eclipse set 1852-1855

Saros 130

References

 NASA chart graphics
 Googlemap
 NASA Besselian elements
 
 The total eclipse of the sun of November 30, 1853 Astronomical Journal, vol. 3, iss. 67, p. 145–146 (1854).

1853 11 30
1853 in science
1853 11 30
November 1853 events